

History
The Hippodrome Circus in Great Yarmouth was built by the showman George Gilbert in 1903 and designed by architect Ralph Scott Cockrill. It is one of only two purpose-built permanent circuses in England still in operation, and one of only three in the world with a circus floor that sinks into a pool.

It is a concrete construction with brick and terracotta facing. Its facade consists of three bays with two towers including Art Nouveau relief foliage patterns in the arched side panels. The main cornice has a frieze of carved owls.

Present
Peter Jay bought the building in 1979, restoring the circus floor that sinks into a water feature in 1981 when he presented his first show.

The Jay Family continue to produce Circus Spectaculars 4 times a year, with Jack Jay as ringmaster and producer and Ben Jay as manager.

Television
Billy Russell's Hippodrome Circus was a series of three programs broadcast by the BBC from Great Yarmouth in July, August and September 1962. The circus director was Roberto Germains and the programs were introduced by Peter West.

References

External links
 The Hippodrome Circus official website
 Historic England

Grade II* listed buildings in Norfolk
Great Yarmouth
1903 establishments in England
Circuses
Theatres completed in 1903